Faro is a department of North Province in Cameroon. The department covers an area of 11,785 km and as of 2001 had a total population of 81,472. The capital of the department lies at Poli.

Subdivisions
The department is divided administratively into three communes and in turn into villages.

Communes 
 Beka 
 Poli (urban)
 Poli (rural)

See also
Communes of Cameroon

References

Departments of Cameroon
North Region (Cameroon)